The 1939 Miami Redskins football team was an American football team that represented Miami University as an independent during the 1939 college football season. In their eighth season under head coach Frank Wilton, the Redskins compiled a 1–7–1 record.

Schedule

References

Miami
Miami RedHawks football seasons
Miami Redskins football